This is the first edition of the tournament as part of the WTA Tour. Isabel Cueto won the inaugural title by defeating Barbara Paulus 6–2, 6–3 in the final.

Seeds

Draw

Finals

Top half

Bottom half

References

External links
 Official results archive (ITF)
 Official results archive (WTA)

Internazionali Femminili di Palermo
1990 WTA Tour